The Controlled Drugs and Substances Act (the Act) is Canada's federal drug control statute. Passed in 1996 under Prime Minister Jean Chrétien's government, it repeals the Narcotic Control Act and Parts III and IV of the Food and Drugs Act, and establishes eight Schedules of controlled substances and two Classes of precursors. It provides that "The Governor in Council may, by order, amend any of Schedules I to VIII by adding to them or deleting from them any item or portion of an item, where the Governor in Council deems the amendment to be necessary in the public interest."

The Act serves as the implementing legislation for the Single Convention on Narcotic Drugs, the Convention on Psychotropic Substances, and the United Nations Convention Against Illicit Traffic in Narcotic Drugs and Psychotropic Substances.

Amendments to the act
In November 2007, the Justice Minister Rob Nicholson introduced Bill C-26, which proposed a number of mandatory minimum penalties imposed on those who commit drug offences. 

On February 27, 2009, Bill C-15, a re-introduction of C-26 received first reading in the second session of the 40th Parliament of Canada. On June 9, 2009, the House of Commons passed Bill C-15 and it went to the Senate for study and approval. On December 14, 2009, the Senate passed Bill C-15, with some amendments, for approval by the House of Commons. When the Canadian Parliament dissolved in a prorogation on January 31, 2010, Bill C-15, along with all unpassed legislation then tabled before the Commons, fell. 

Early in 2012, the next parliament passed the Safe Streets and Communities Act, which received Royal Assent in March. The final legislation sees changes made to four areas of the Act, outlining mandatory minimum sentences for offences relating to the trafficking and production of various controlled substances. Mandatory minimum sentencing does not apply to simple possession and trafficking in smaller amounts. 

On October 17, 2018, the federal Cannabis Act came into effect, legalizing the possession, sale and production of cannabis. Everyone with a criminal record for cannabis possession became eligible to apply for a pardon on this date.

List of drugs

The list below reflects the list of drugs scheduled in Canada's Controlled Drugs and Substances Act.

Schedule I
 Opium Poppy (Papaver somniferum), its preparations, derivatives, alkaloids and salts, including:
 Opium
 Codeine (methylmorphine)
 Morphine (7,8-didehydro-4,5-epoxy-17-methylmorphinan-3,6-diol)
 Thebaine (paramorphine)and the salts, derivatives and salts of derivatives of the substances set out in subitems (1) to (4), including:
 Acetorphine (acetyletorphine)
 Acetyldihydrocodeine (4,5-epoxy-3-methoxy-17-methylmorphinan-6-ol acetate)
 Benzylmorphine (7,8-didehydro-4,5-epoxy-17-methyl-3-(phenylmethoxy) morphinan-6-ol)
 Codoxime (dihydrocodeinone O-(carboxymethyl) oxime)
 Desomorphine (dihydrodeoxymorphine)
 Diacetylmorphine (heroin)
 Dihydrocodeine (4,5-epoxy-3-methoxy-17-methylmorphinan-6-ol)
 Dihydromorphine (4,5-epoxy-17-methylmorphinan-3,6-diol)
 Ethylmorphine (7,8-didehydro-4,5-epoxy-3-ethoxy-17-methylmorphinan-6-ol)
 Etorphine (tetrahydro-7α-(1-hydroxy-1-methyl-butyl)-6,14-endo-ethenooripavine)
 Hydrocodone (dihydrocodeinone)
 Hydromorphinol (dihydro-14-hydroxymorphine)
 Hydromorphone (dihydromorphinone)
 Methyldesorphine (Δ6-deoxy-6-methylmorphine)
 Methyldihydromorphine (dihydro-6-methylmorphine)
 Metopon (dihydromethylmorphinone)
 Morphine-N-oxide (morphine oxide)
 Myrophine (benzylmorphine myristate)
 Nalorphine (N-allylnormorphine)
 Nicocodine (6-nicotinylcodeine)
 Nicomorphine (dinicotinylmorphine)
 Norcodeine (N-desmethylcodeine)
 Normorphine (N-desmethylmorphine)
 Oxycodone (dihydrohydroxycodeinone)
 Oxymorphone (dihydrohydroxymorphinone)
 Pholcodine (3-[2-(4-morpholinyl)ethyl]morphine)
 Thebacon (acetyldihydrocodeinone)but not including:

 Apomorphine (5,6,6a,7-tetrahydro-6-methyl-4H-dibenzo[de,g]quinoline-10,11-diol) and its salts
 Cyprenorphine (N-(cyclopropylmethyl)-6,7,8,14-tetrahydro-7α-(1-hydroxy-1-methylethyl)-6,14-endo-ethenonororipavine) and its salts
 Nalmefene (17-(cyclopropylmethyl)-4,5α-epoxy-6-methylenemorphinan-3,14-diol) and its salts
 Naloxone (4,5α-epoxy-3,14-dihydroxy-17-(2-propenyl)morphinan-6-one) and its salts
 Naltrexone (17-(cyclopropylmethyl)-4,5α-epoxy-3,14-dihydroxymorphinan-6-one) and its salts
 Methylnaltrexone (17-(cyclopropylmethyl)-4,5α-epoxy-3,14-dihydroxy-17-methyl-6-oxomorphinanium) and its salts
 Naloxegol (4,5α-epoxy-6α-(3,6,9,12,15,18,21-heptaoxadocos-1-yloxy)-17-(2-propenyl)morphinan-3,14-diol) and its salts
 Narcotine (6,7-dimethoxy-3-(5,6,7,8-tetra-hydro-4-methoxy-6-methyl-1,3-dioxolos [4,5-g]isoquinolin-5-yl)-1(3H)-isobenzofuranone) and its salts
 Papaverine (1-[(3,4-dimethoxyphenyl)methyl]-6,7-dimethoxyisoquinoline) and its salts
 Poppy seed
 Coca (Erythroxylon), its preparations, derivatives, alkaloids and salts, including:
 Coca leaves
 Cocaine (benzoylmethylecgonine)
 Ecgonine (3-hydroxy-2-tropane carboxylic acid)
 Phenylpiperidines, their intermediates, salts, derivatives and analogues and salts of intermediates, derivatives and analogues, including:
 Allylprodine (3-allyl-1-methyl-4-phenyl-4-piperidinol propionate)
 Alphameprodine (α-3-ethyl-1-methyl-4-phenyl-4-piperidinol propionate)
 Alphaprodine (α-1,3-dimethyl-4-phenyl-4-piperidinol propionate)
 Anileridine (ethyl 1-[2-(p-aminophenyl)ethyl]-4-phenylpiperidine-4-carboxylate)
 Betameprodine (β-3-ethyl-1-methyl-4-phenyl-4-piperidinol propionate)
 Betaprodine (β-1,3-dimethyl-4-phenyl-4-piperidinol propionate)
 Benzethidine (ethyl 1-(2-benzyloxyethyl)-4-phenylpiperidine-4-carboxylate)
 Diphenoxylate (ethyl 1-(3-cyano-3,3-diphenylpropyl)-4-phenylpiperidine-4-carboxylate)
 Difenoxin (1-(3-cyano-3,3-diphenylpropyl)-4-phenylpiperidine-4-carboxylate)
 Etoxeridine (ethyl 1-[2-(2-hydroxyethoxy) ethyl]-4-phenylpiperidine-4-carboxylate)
 Furethidine (ethyl 1-(2-tetrahydrofurfury loxyethyl)-4-phenylpiperidine-4-carboxylate)
 Hydroxypethidine (ethyl 4-(m-hydroxyphenyl)-1-methylpiperidine-4-carboxylate)
 Ketobemidone (1-[4-(m-hydroxyphenyl)-1-methyl-4-piperidyl]-1-propanone)
 Methylphenylisonipecotonitrile (4-cyano-1-methyl-4-phenylpiperidine)
 Morpheridine (ethyl 1-(2-morpholinoethyl)-4-phenylpiperidine-4-carboxylate)
 Norpethidine (ethyl 4-phenylpiperidine-4-carboxylate)
 Pethidine (ethyl 1-methyl-4-phenylpiperidine-4-carboxylate)
 Phenoperidine (ethyl 1-(3-hydroxy-3-phenylpropyl)-4-phenylpiperidine-4-carboxylate)
 Piminodine (ethyl 1-[3-(phenylamino)propyl]-4-phenylpiperidine-4-carboxylate)
 Properidine (isopropyl 1-methyl-4-phenylpiperidine-4-carboxylate)
 Trimeperidine (1,2,5-trimethyl-4-phenyl-4-piperidinol propionate)
 Pethidine Intermediate C (1-methyl-4-phenylpiperidine-4-carboxylate)but not including:

 Carbamethidine (ethyl 1-(2-carbamylethyl)-4-phenylpiperidine-4-carboxylate) and its salts
 Oxpheneridine (ethyl 1-(2-hydroxy-2-phenylethyl)-4-phenylpiperidine-4-carboxylate) and its salts
 Phenazepines, their salts, derivatives and salts of derivatives including:
 Proheptazine (hexahydro-1,3-dimethyl-4-phenyl-1H-azepin-4-ol propionate)but not including:

 Ethoheptazine (ethyl hexahydro-1-methyl-4-phenyl-azepine-4-carboxylate) and its salts
 Metethoheptazine (ethyl hexahydro-1,3-dimethyl-4-phenylazepine-4-carboxylate) and its salts
 Metheptazine and its salts
 Amidones, their intermediates, salts, derivatives and salts of intermediates and derivatives including:
 Dimethylaminodiphenylbutanonitrile (4-cyano-2-dimethylamino-4,4-diphenylbutane)
 Dipipanone (4,4-diphenyl-6-piperidino-3-heptanone)
 Isomethadone (6-dimethylamino-5-methyl-4,4-diphenyl-3-hexanone)
 Methadone (6-dimethylamino-4,4-diphenyl-3-heptanone)
 Normethadone (6-dimethylamino-4,4-diphenyl-3-hexanone)
 Norpipanone (4,4-diphenyl-6-piperidino-3-hexanone)
 Phenadoxone (6-morpholino-4,4-diphenyl-3-heptanone)
 Methadols, their salts, derivatives and salts of derivatives including:
 Acetylmethadol (6-dimethylamino-4,4-diphenyl-3-heptanol acetate)
 Alphacetylmethadol (α-6-dimethylamino-4,4-diphenyl-3-heptanol acetate)
 Alphamethadol (α-6-dimethylamino-4,4-diphenyl-3-heptanol)
 Betacetylmethadol (β-6-dimethylamino-4,4-diphenyl-3-heptanol acetate)
 Betamethadol (β-6-dimethylamino-4,4-diphenyl-3-heptanol)
 Dimepheptanol (6-dimethylamino-4,4-diphenyl-3-heptanol)
 Noracymethadol (α-6-methylamino-4,4-diphenyl-3-heptanol acetate)
 Phenalkoxams, their salts, derivatives and salts of derivatives including:
 Dimenoxadol (dimethylaminoethyl 1-ethoxy-1,1-diphenylacetate)
 Dioxaphetyl butyrate (ethyl 2,2-diphenyl-4-morpholinobutyrate)
 Dextropropoxyphene ([S-(R*,S*)]-α-[2-(dimethylamino)-1-methylethyl]-α-phenylbenzeneethanol, propanoate ester)
 Thiambutenes, their salts, derivatives and salts of derivatives including:
 Diethylthiambutene (N,N-diethyl-1-methyl-3,3-di-2-thienylallylamine)
 Dimethylthiambutene (N,N,1-trimethyl-3,3-di-2-thienylallylamine)
 Ethylmethylthiambutene (N-ethyl-N,1-dimethyl-3,3-di-2-thienylallylamine)
 Moramides, their intermediates, salts, derivatives and salts of intermediates and derivatives including:
 Dextromoramide (d-1-(3-methyl-4-morpholino-2,2-diphenylbutyryl)pyrrolidine)
 Diphenylmorpholinoisovaleric acid (2-methyl-3-morpholino-1,1-diphenylpropionic acid)
 Levomoramide (l-1-(3-methyl-4-morpholino-2,2-diphenylbutyryl)pyrrolidine)
 Racemoramide (d,l-1-(3-methyl-4-morpholino-2,2-diphenylbutyryl) pyrrolidine)
 Morphinans, their salts, derivatives and salts of derivatives including:
 Buprenorphine (17-(cyclopropylmethyl)-α-(1,1-dimethylethyl)-4,5-epoxy-18,19-dihydro-3-hydroxy-6-methoxy-α-methyl-6,14-ethenomorphinan-7-methanol)
 Drotebanol (6β,14-dihydroxy-3,4-dimethoxy-17-methylmorphinan)
 Levomethorphan (l-3-methoxy-17-methylmorphinan)
 Levorphanol (l-3-hydroxy-17-methylmorphinan)
 Levophenacylmorphan (l-3-hydroxy-17-phenacylmorphinan)
 Norlevorphanol (l-3-hydroxymorphinan)
 Phenomorphan (3-hydroxy-17-(2-phenylethyl)morphinan)
 Racemethorphan (d,1-3-methoxy-17-methylmorphinan)
 Racemorphan (d,l-3-hydroxy-N-methylmorphinan)but not including:

 Dextromethorphan (d-1,2,3,9,10,10a-hexahydro-6-methoxy-11-methyl-4H-10,4a-iminoethano-phenanthren) and its salts
 Dextrorphan (d-1,2,3,9,10,10a-hexahydro-11-methyl-4H-10,4a-iminoethanophenanthren-6-ol) and its salts
 Levallorphan (l-11-allyl-1,2,3,9,10,10a-hexahydro-4H-10,4a-iminoethanophenanthren-6-ol) and its salts
 Levargorphan (l-11-propargyl-1,2,3,9,10,10a-hexahydro-4H-10,4a-iminoethanophenanthren-6-ol) and its salts
 Butorphanol (17-(cyclobutylmethyl)morphinan-3,14-diol) and its salts
 Nalbuphine (17-(cyclobutylmethyl)-4,5α-epoxymorphinan-3,6α, 14-triol) and its salts
 Benzazocines, their salts, derivatives and salts of derivatives including:
 Phenazocine (1,2,3,4,5,6-hexahydro-6,11-dimethyl-3-phenethyl-2,6-methano-3-benzazocin-8-ol)
 Metazocine (1,2,3,4,5,6-hexahydro-3,6,11-trimethyl-2,6-methano-3-benzazocin-8-ol)
 Pentazocine (1,2,3,4,5,6-hexahydro-6,11-dimethyl-3-(3-methyl-2-butenyl)-2,6-methano-3-benzazocin-8-ol)but not including:

 Cyclazocine (1,2,3,4,5,6-hexahydro-6,11-dimethyl-3-(cyclopropylmethyl)-2,6-methano-3-benzazocin-8-ol) and its salts
 Ampromides, their salts, derivatives and salts of derivatives including:
 Diampromide (N-[2-(methylphenethylamino)propyl] propionanilide)
 Phenampromide (N-(1-methyl-2-piperidino) ethyl) propionanilide)
 Propiram (N-(1-methyl-2-piperidinoethyl)-N-2-pyridylpropionamide)
Benzimidazoles, their salts, derivatives and salts of derivatives including:
 Clonitazene (2-(p-chlorobenzyl)-1-diethylaminoethyl-5-nitrobenzimidazole)
 Etonitazene (2-(p-ethoxybenzyl)-1-diethylaminoethyl-5-nitrobenzimidazole)
 Bezitramide (1-(3-cyano-3,3-diphenylpropyl)-4-(2-oxo-3-propionyl-1-benzimidazolinyl)-piperidine)
 Phencyclidine (1-(1-phenylcyclohexyl)piperidine), its salts, derivatives and analogues and salts of derivatives and analogues, including:
 Ketamine (2-(2-chlorophenyl)-2-(methylamino)cyclohexanone)
 Piritramide (1-(3-cyano-3,3-diphenylpropyl)-4-(1-piperidino)piperidine-4-carboxylic acid amide), its salts, derivatives and salts of derivatives
 Fentanyls, their salts, derivatives, and analogues and salts of derivatives and analogues, including:
 Acetyl-α-methylfentanyl (N-[1-(α-methylphenethyl)-4-piperidyl] acetanilide)
 Alfentanil (N-[1-[2-(4-ethyl-4,5-dihydro-5-oxo-1H-tetrazol-1-yl)ethyl]-4-(methoxymethyl)-4-piperidyl]propionanilide)
 Carfentanil (methyl 4-[(1-oxopropyl)phenylamino]-1-(2-phenethyl)-4-piperidinecarboxylate)
 p-Fluorofentanyl (4′fluoro-N-(1-phenethyl-4-piperidyl) propionanilide)
 Fentanyl (N-(1-phenethyl-4-piperidyl) propionanilide)
 β-Hydroxyfentanyl (N-[1-(β-hydroxyphenethyl)-4-piperidyl] propionanilide)
 β-Hydroxy-3-methylfentanyl (N-[1-(β-hydroxyphenethyl)-3-methyl-4-piperidyl] propionanilide)
 α-Methylfentanyl (N-[1-(α-methylphenethyl)-4-piperidyl] propionanilide)
 α-Methylthiofentanyl (N-[1-[1-methyl-2-(2-thienyl) ethyl]-4-piperidyl] propionanilide)
 3-Methylfentanyl (N-(3-methyl-1-phenethyl-4-piperidyl) propionanilide)
 3-Methylthiofentanyl (N-[3-methyl-1-[2-(2-thienyl) ethyl]-4-piperidyl] propionanilide)
 Remifentanil (dimethyl 4-carboxy-4-(N-phenylpropionamido)-1-piperidinepropionate)
 Sufentanil (N-[4-(methoxymethyl)-1-[2-(2-thienyl)ethyl]-4-piperidyl] propionanilide)
 Thiofentanyl (N-[1-[2-(2-thienyl)ethyl]-4-piperidyl] propionanilide)
 Tilidine (ethyl2-(dimethylamino)-1-phenyl-3-cyclohexene-1-carboxylate), its salts, derivatives and salts of derivatives
 Methylenedioxypyrovalerone (MDPV), its salts, derivatives, isomers and analogues and salts of derivatives, isomers and analogues
 Methamphetamine (N,α-dimethylbenzeneethanamine), its salts, derivatives, isomers and analogues and salts of derivatives, isomers and analogues
 Amphetamines, their salts, derivatives, isomers and analogues and salts of derivatives, isomers and analogues including:
 Amphetamine (α-methylbenzene-ethanamine)
 N-ethylamphetamine (N-ethyl-α-methylbenzeneethanamine)
 4-methyl-2,5-dimethoxyamphetamine (STP) (2,5-dimethoxy-4,α-dimethylbenzeneethanamine)
 3,4-Methylenedioxyamphetamine (MDA) (α-methyl-1,3-benzodioxole-5-ethanamine)
 2,5-dimethoxyamphetamine (2,5-dimethoxy-α-methylbenzene-ethanamine)
 4-methoxyamphetamine (4-methoxy-α-methylbenzeneethanamine)
 2,4,5-trimethoxyamphetamine (2,4,5-trimethoxy-α-methylbenzeneethanamine)
 N-methyl-3,4-methylenedioxy- amphetamine (N,α-dimethyl-1,3-benzodioxole-5-ethanamine)
 4-ethoxy-2,5-dimethoxyamphetamine (4-ethoxy-2,5-dimethoxy-α-methylbenzeneethanamine)
 5-methoxy-3,4-methylenedioxy- amphetamine (7-methoxy-α-methyl-1,3-benzodioxole-5-ethanamine)
 N,N-dimethyl-3,4-methylenedioxyamphetamine (N,N, α-trimethyl-1,3-benzodioxole-5-ethanamine)
 N-ethyl-3,4-methylenedioxyamphetamine (N-ethyl-α-methyl-1,3-benzodioxole-5-ethanamine)
 4-ethyl-2,5-dimethoxyamphetamine (DOET) (4-ethyl-2,5-dimethoxy-α-methylbenzeneethanamine)
 4-bromo-2,5-dimethoxyamphetamine (4-bromo-2,5-dimethoxy-α-methylbenzeneethanamine)
 4-chloro-2,5-dimethoxyamphetamine (4-chloro-2,5-dimethoxy-α-methyl-benzeneethanamine)
 4-ethoxyamphetamine (4-ethoxy-α-methylbenzeneethanamine)
 Benzphetamine (N-benzyl-N,α-dimethylbenzeneethanamine)
 N-Propyl-3,4-methylenedioxy- amphetamine (α-methyl-N-propyl-1,3-benzodioxole-5-ethanamine)
 N-(2-Hydroxyethyl)-α-meth-ylbenzeneethanamine
 N-hydroxy-3,4-methylenedioxy- amphetamine (N-[α-methyl-3,4-(methylenedioxy)phenethyl]hydroxylamine)
 3,4,5-trimethoxyamphetamine (3,4,5-trimethoxy-α-methylbenzeneethanamine)
 Flunitrazepam (5-(o-fluorophenyl)-1,3-dihydro-1-methyl-7-nitro-2H-1,4-benzodiazepin-2-one) and any of its salts or derivatives
 4-hydroxybutanoic acid (GHB) and any of its salts
 Tapentadol (3-[(1R,2R)-3-(dimethylamino)-1-ethyl-2-methylpropyl]-phenol), its salts, derivatives and isomers and salts of derivatives and isomers
 AH-7921 (1-(3,4-dichlorobenzamidomethyl)cyclohexyldimethylamine), its salts, isomers and salts of isomers
 MT-45 (1-cyclohexyl-4-(1,2-diphenylethyl)piperazine), its salts, derivatives, isomers and analogues and salts of derivatives, isomers and analogues, including:
 Diphenidine (DEP) (1-(1,2-diphenylethyl)piperidine)
 Methoxphenidine (2-MeO-Diphenidine, MXP) (1-[1-(2-methoxyphenyl)-2-phenylethyl]piperidine)
 Ephenidine (NEDPA, EPE) (N-ethyl-1,2-diphenylethylamine)
 Isophenidine (NPDPA) (N-isopropyl-1,2-diphenylethylamine)but not including:

 Lefetamine ((-)-N,N-dimethyl-α-phenylbenzeneethanamine), its salts, derivatives and isomers and salts of derivatives and isomers
 W-18 (-chloro-N-[1-[2-(4-nitrophenyl)ethyl]-2-piperidinylidene]benzenesulfonamide), its salts, derivatives, isomers and analogues and salts of derivatives, isomers and analogues
 U-47700 (3,4-dichloro-N-(2-(dimethylamino)cyclohexyl)-N-methylbenzamide), its salts, derivatives, isomers and analogues, and salts of derivatives, isomers and analogues, including:
 Bromadoline (4-bromo-N-(2-(dimethylamino)cyclohexyl)benzamide)
 U-47109 (3,4-dichloro-N-(2-(dimethylamino)cyclohexyl)benzamide)
 U-48520 (4-chloro-N-(2-(dimethylamino)cyclohexyl)-N-methylbenzamide)
 U-50211 (N-(2-(dimethylamino)cyclohexyl)-4-hydroxy-N-methylbenzamide)
 U-77891 (3,4-dibromo-N-methyl-N-(1-methyl-1-azaspiro[4.5]decan-6-yl)benzamide)
 Tramadol (2-[(dimethylamino)methyl]-1-(3-methoxyphenyl)cyclohexanol), its salts, isomers and salts of isomers and the following derivatives of tramadol and the salts, isomers and salts of isomers of those derivatives:
 O-desmethyltramadol (3-[2-[(dimethylamino)methyl]-1-hydroxycyclohexyl]-phenol)
 N,O-didesmethyltramadol (3-[1-hydroxy-2-[(methylamino)methyl]cyclohexyl]-phenol)

Schedule II
 Synthetic cannabinoid receptor type 1 agonists, their salts, derivatives, isomers, and salts of derivatives and isomers — with the exception of any substance that is identical to any phytocannabinoid and with the exception of ((3S)-2,3-dihydro-5-methyl-3-(4-morpholinylmethyl)pyrrolo[1,2,3-de]-1,4-benzoxazin-6-yl)-1-naphthalenyl-methanone (WIN 55,212-3) and its salts—including those that fall within the following core chemical structure classes:
 Any substance that has a 2-(cyclohexyl)phenol structure with substitution at the 1-position of the benzene ring by a hydroxy, ether or ester group and further substituted at the 5-position of the benzene ring, whether or not further substituted on the benzene ring to any extent, and substituted at the 3'-position of the cyclohexyl ring by an alkyl, carbonyl, hydroxyl, ether or ester, and whether or not further substituted on the cyclohexyl ring to any extent, including
 Nabilone ((±)-trans-3-(1,1-dimethylheptyl)-6,6a,7,8,10,10a-hexahydro-1-hydroxy-6,6-dimethyl-9H-dibenzo[b,d]pyran-9-one)
 Parahexyl (3-hexyl-6,6,9-trimethyl-7,8,9,10-tetrahydro-6H-dibenzo[b,d]pyran-1-ol)
 3-(1,2-dimethylheptyl)-7,8,9,10-tetrahydro-6,6,9-trimethyl-6H-dibenzo[b,d]pyran-1-ol (DMHP)
 5-(1,1-dimethylheptyl)-2-(5-hydroxy-2-(3-hydroxypropyl)cyclohexyl)phenol (CP 55,940)
 5-(1,1-dimethylheptyl)-2-(3-hydroxycyclohexyl)phenol (CP 47,497)
 Any substance that has a 3-(1-naphthoyl)indole structure with substitution at the nitrogen atom of the indole ring, whether or not further substituted on the indole ring to any extent and whether or not substituted on the naphthyl ring to any extent, including
 1-pentyl-3-(1-naphthoyl)indole (JWH-018)
 1-butyl-3-(1-naphthoyl)indole (JWH-073)
 1-pentyl-3-(4-methyl-1-naphthoyl)indole (JWH-122)
 1-hexyl-3-(1-naphthoyl)indole (JWH-019)
 1-(4-pentenyl)-3-(1-naphthoyl)indole (JWH-022)
 1-butyl-3-(4-methoxy-1-naphthoyl)indole (JWH-080)
 1-pentyl-3-(4-methoxy-1-naphthoyl)indole (JWH-081)
 1-(2-morpholin-4-ylethyl)-3-(1-naphthoyl)indole (JWH-200)
 1-pentyl-3-(4-ethyl-1-naphthoyl)indole (JWH-210)
 1-pentyl-3-(2-methoxy-1-naphthoyl)indole (JWH-267)
 1-[(N-methylpiperidin-2-yl)methyl]-3-(1-naphthoyl)indole (AM-1220)
 1-(5-fluoropentyl)-3-(1-naphthoyl)indole (AM-2201)
 1-(5-fluoropentyl)-3-(4-methyl-1-naphthoyl)indole (MAM-2201)
 1-(5-fluoropentyl)-3-(4-ethyl-1-naphthoyl)indole (EAM-2201)
 ((3R)-2,3-dihydro-5-methyl-3-(4-morpholinylmethyl)pyrrolo[1,2,3-de]-1,4-benzoxazin-6-yl)-1-naphthalenyl-methanone (WIN 55,212-2)
 Any substance that has a 3-(1-naphthoyl)pyrrole structure with substitution at the nitrogen atom of the pyrrole ring, whether or not further substituted on the pyrrole ring to any extent and whether or not substituted on the naphthyl ring to any extent, including
 1-pentyl-5-(2-fluorophenyl)-3-(1-naphthoyl)pyrrole (JWH-307)
 Any substance that has a 3-phenylacetylindole structure with substitution at the nitrogen atom of the indole ring, whether or not further substituted on the indole ring to any extent and whether or not substituted on the phenyl ring to any extent, including
 1-pentyl-3-(2-methoxyphenylacetyl)indole (JWH-250)
 1-pentyl-3-(2-methylphenylacetyl)indole (JWH-251)
 1-pentyl-3-(3-methoxyphenylacetyl)indole (JWH-302)
 Any substance that has a 3-benzoylindole structure with substitution at the nitrogen atom of the indole ring, whether or not further substituted on the indole ring to any extent and whether or not substituted on the phenyl ring to any extent, including
 1-(1-methylpiperidin-2-ylmethyl)-3-(2-iodobenzoyl)indole (AM-2233)
 Any substance that has a 3-methanone(cyclopropyl)indole structure with substitution at the nitrogen atom of the indole ring, whether or not further substituted on the indole ring to any extent and whether or not substituted on the cyclopropyl ring to any extent, including
 (1-pentyl-1H-indol-3-yl)(2,2,3,3-tetramethylcyclopropyl)-methanone (UR-144)
 (1-(5-fluoropentyl)-1H-indol-3-yl)(2,2,3,3-tetramethylcyclopropyl)-methanone (5F-UR-144)
 (1-(2-(4-morpholinyl)ethyl)-1H-indol-3-yl)(2,2,3,3-tetramethylcyclopropyl)-methanone (A-796,260)
 Any substance that has a quinolin-8-yl 1H-indole-3-carboxylate structure with substitution at the nitrogen atom of the indole ring, whether or not further substituted on the indole ring to any extent and whether or not substituted on the quinolin-8-yl ring to any extent, including
 1-pentyl-8-quinolinyl ester-1H-indole-3-carboxylic acid (PB-22)
 1-(5-fluoropentyl)-8-quinolinyl ester-1H-indole-3-carboxylic acid (5F-PB-22)
 Any substance that has a 3-carboxamideindazole structure with substitution at the nitrogen atom of the indazole ring, whether or not further substituted on the indazole ring to any extent and whether or not substituted at the carboxamide group to any extent, including
 N-(adamantan-1-yl)-1-pentyl-1H-indazole-3-carboxamide (AKB48)
 N-(adamantan-1-yl)-1-(5-fluoropentyl)-1H-indazole-3-carboxamide (5F-AKB48)
 N-(1-(aminocarbonyl)-2-methylpropyl)-1-(4-fluorobenzyl)-1H-indazole-3-carboxamide (AB-FUBINACA)
 N-(1-amino-3-methyl-1-oxobutan-2-yl)-1-pentyl-1H-indazole-3-carboxamide (AB-PINACA)
 Any substance that has a 3-carboxamideindole structure with substitution at the nitrogen atom of the indole ring, whether or not further substituted on the indole ring to any extent and whether or not substituted at the carboxamide group to any extent, including
 N-(adamantan-1-yl)-1-fluoropentylindole-3-carboxamide (STS-135)
 N-(adamantan-1-yl)-1-pentylindole-3-carboxamide (APICA)

Schedule III
 Methylphenidate (α-phenyl-2-piperidineacetic acid methyl ester) and any salts, derivatives, isomers, and analogues and salts of derivatives, isomers, and analogues, including:
Ethylphenidate (ethyl 2-phenyl-2-(piperidin-2-yl)acetate)
Isopropylphenidate (isopropyl 2-phenyl-2-(piperidin-2-yl)acetate)
Propylphenidate (propyl 2-phenyl-2-(piperidin-2-yl)acetate)
3,4-Dichloromethylphenidate (methyl 2-(3,4-dichlorophenyl)-2-(piperidin-2-yl)acetate)
4-Methylmethylphenidate (methyl 2-(4-methylphenyl)-2-(piperidin-2-yl)acetate)
4-Fluoromethylphenidate (methyl 2-(4-fluorophenyl)-2-(piperidin-2-yl)acetate)
Methylnaphthidate (methyl 2-(naphthalen-2-yl)-2-(piperidin-2-yl)acetate)
Ethylnaphthidate (ethyl 2-(naphthalen-2-yl)-2-(piperidin-2-yl)acetate)
Methaqualone (2-methyl-3-(2-methylphenyl)-4(3H)-quinazolinone) and any salt thereof
Mecloqualone (2-methyl-3-(2-chlorophenyl)-4(3H)-quinazolinone) and any salt thereof 11
 LSD (lysergic acid diethylamide) (N,N-diethyllysergamide) and any salt thereof
DET (N,N-Diethyltryptamine) (3-[(2-diethylamino) ethyl]indole) and any salt thereof
DMT (N,N-Dimethyltryptamine) (3-[(2-dimethylamino) ethyl]indole) and any salt thereof
 JB-336 (N-Methyl-3-piperidyl benzilate or LBJ) (3-[(hydroxydiphenylacetyl)oxy]-1-methylpiperidine) and any salt thereof
Harmaline (4,9-dihydro-7-methoxy-1-methyl-3H-pyrido(3,4-b)indole) and any salt thereof
Harmalol (4,9-dihydro-1-methyl-3H-pyrido(3,4-b)indol-7-ol) and any salt thereof
Psilocin (3-[2-(dimethylamino)ethyl]-4-hydroxyindole) and any salt thereof
Psilocybin (3-[2-(dimethylamino)ethyl]-4-phosphoryloxyindole) and any salt thereof
 PCE (N-(1-phenylcyclohexyl)ethylamine) and any salt thereof
TCP (1-[1-(2-Thienyl) cyclohexyl]piperidine) and any salt thereof
PCPr (1-Phenyl-N-propylcyclohexanamine) and any salt thereof
Rolicyclidine (1-(1-phenylcyclohexyl) pyrrolidine) and any salt thereof
Mescaline (3,4,5-trimethoxybenzeneethanamine) and any salt thereof, but not peyote (lophophora)
 4-Methylaminorex (4,5-dihydro-4-methyl-5-phenyl-2-oxazolamine) and any salt thereof
Cathinone ((-)-α-aminopropiophenone) and any salt thereof
Fenetylline (d,l-3,7-dihydro-1,3-dimethyl-7-(2-[(1-methyl-2-phenethyl)amino]ethyl)-1H-purine-2, 6-dione) and any salt thereof
Methcathinone (2-Methylamino-1-phenyl-1-propanone) and any salt thereof
 Benzylcyclidine (1-[1-(Phenylmethyl)cyclohexyl]piperidine) and any salt thereof
 4-Methyl-PCP (1-[1-(4-Methylphenyl)cyclohexyl]piperidine) and any salt thereof
 [Repealed, SOR/2016-73, s. 1]
 [Repealed, 2012, c. 1, s. 46]
 [Repealed, 2012, c. 1, s. 46]
Aminorex (4,5-dihydro-5-phenyl-2-oxazolamine) and any salt thereof
Etryptamine (3-(2-aminobutyl)indole) and any salt thereof
Lefetamine ((-)-N,N-dimethyl-α-phenylbenzeneethanamine) and any salt thereof
Mesocarb (3-(α-methylphenethyl)-N-(phenylcarbamoyl)sydnone imine) and any salt thereof
Zipeprol (4-(2-methoxy-2-phenylethyl)-α-(methoxyphenylmethyl)-1-piperazineethanol) and any salt thereof
Amineptine (7-[(10,11-dihydro-5H-dibenzo[a,d]cyclohepten-5-yl)amino]heptanoic acid) and any salt thereof
 BZP (Benzylpiperazine) (1-benzylpiperazine) and its salts, isomers and salts of isomers
 TFMPP (Trifluoromethylphenylpiperazine) (1-(3-trifluoromethylphenyl)piperazine) and its salts, isomers and salts of isomers
2C-phenethylamines and their salts, derivatives, isomers and salts of derivatives and isomers that correspond to the following chemical description:
 any substance that has a 1-amino-2-phenylethane structure substituted at the 2' and 5' or 2' and 6' positions of the benzene ring by an alkoxy or haloalkoxy group, or substituted at two adjacent carbon atoms of the benzene ring which results in the formation of a furan, dihydrofuran, pyran, dihydropyran or methylenedioxy group—whether or not further substituted on the benzene ring to any extent, whether or not substituted at the amino group by one or two, or a combination of, methyl, ethyl, propyl, isopropyl, hydroxyl, benzyl (or benzyl substituted to any extent) or benzylene (or benzylene substituted to any extent) groups and whether or not substituted at the 2-ethyl (beta carbon) position by a hydroxyl, oxo or alkoxy group—and its salts and derivatives and salts of derivatives, including:

 4-bromo-2,5-dimethoxy-N-(2-methoxybenzyl)phenethylamine (25B-NBOMe)
 4-chloro-2,5-dimethoxy-N-(2-methoxybenzyl)phenethylamine (25C-NBOMe)
 4-iodo-2,5-dimethoxy-N-(2-methoxybenzyl)phenethylamine (25I-NBOMe)
 4-bromo-2,5-dimethoxybenzeneethanamine (2C-B)

Schedule IV
 Barbiturates, their salts and derivatives including
 Allobarbital (5,5-diallylbarbituric acid)
 Alphenal (5-allyl-5-phenylbarbituric acid)
 Amobarbital (5-ethyl-5-(3-methylbutyl)barbituric acid)
 Aprobarbital (5-allyl-5-isopropylbarbituric acid)
 Barbital (5,5-diethylbarbituric acid)
 [Repealed, SOR/2017-13, s. 7]
 Butabarbital (5-sec-butyl-5-ethylbarbituric acid)
 Butalbital (5-allyl-5-isobutylbarbituric acid)
 Butallylonal (5-(2-bromoallyl)-5-sec-butylbarbituric acid)
 Butethal (5-butyl-5-ethylbarbituric acid)
 Cyclobarbital (5-(1-cyclohexen-1-yl)-5-ethylbarbituric acid)
 Cyclopal (5-allyl-5-(2-cyclopenten-1-yl)barbituric acid)
 Heptabarbital (5-(1-cyclohepten-1-yl)-5-ethylbarbituric acid)
 Hexethal (5-ethyl-5-hexylbarbituric acid)
 Hexobarbital (5-(1-cyclohexen-1-yl)-1,5-dimethylbarbituric acid)
 Mephobarbital (5-ethyl-1-methyl-5-phenylbarbituric acid)
 Methabarbital (5,5-diethyl-1-methylbarbituric acid)
 Methylphenobarbital (5-ethyl-1-methyl-5-phenylbarbituric acid)
 Propallylonal (5-(2-bromoallyl)-5-isopropylbarbituric acid)
 Pentobarbital (5-ethyl-5-(1-methylbutyl)barbituric acid)
 Phenobarbital (5-ethyl-5-phenylbarbituric acid)
 Probarbital (5-ethyl-5-isopropylbarbituric acid)
 Phenylmethylbarbituric acid (5-methyl-5-phenylbarbituric acid)
 Secobarbital (5-allyl-5-(1-methylbutyl)barbituric acid)
 Sigmodal (5-(2-bromoallyl)-5-(1-methylbutyl) barbituric acid)
 Talbutal (5-allyl-5-sec-butylbarbituric acid)
 Vinbarbital (5-ethyl-5-(1-methyl-1-butenyl)barbituric acid)
 Vinylbital (5-(1-methylbutyl)-5-vinylbarbituric acid)but not including:
 Barbituric acid (2,4,6(1H,3H,5H)-pyrimidinetrione) and its salts
 1,3-dimethylbarbituric acid (1,3-dimethyl-2,4,6(1H,3H,5H)-pyrimidinetrione) and its salts
 Thiobarbiturates, their salts and derivatives including:
 Thialbarbital (5-allyl-5-(2-cyclohexen-1-yl)-2-thiobarbituric acid)
 Thiamylal (5-allyl-5-(1-methylbutyl)-2-thiobarbituric acid)
 Thiobarbituric acid (2-thiobarbituric acid)
 Thiopental (5-ethyl-5-(1-methylbutyl)-2-thiobarbituric acid)
 Chlorphentermine (1-(p-chlorophenyl)-2-methyl-2-aminopropane) and any salt thereof
Diethylpropion (2-(diethylamino)propiophenone) and any salt thereof
 Phendimetrazine (d-3,4-dimethyl-2-phenylmorpholine) and any salt thereof
 Phenmetrazine (3-methyl-2-phenylmorpholine) and any salt thereof
Pipradrol (α,α-diphenyl-2-piperidinemethanol) and any salt thereof
 Phentermine (α,α-dimethylbenzeneethanamine) and any salt thereof
 Butorphanol (l-N-cyclobutylmethyl-3,14-dihydroxymorphinan) and any salt thereof
 Nalbuphine (N-cyclobutylmethyl-4,5-epoxy-morphinan-3,6,14-triol) and any salt thereof
 Glutethimide (2-ethyl-2-phenylglutarimide)
 Clotiazepam (5-(o-chlorophenyl)-7-ethyl-1,3-dihydro-1-methyl-2H-thieno[2,3-e]-1,4-diazepin-2-one) and any salt thereof
 Ethchlorvynol (ethyl-2-chlorovinyl ethynyl carbinol)
 Ethinamate (1-ethynylcyclohexanol carbamate)
 Mazindol (5-(p-chlorophenyl)-2,5-dihydro-3H-imidazo[2,1-a]isoindol-5-ol)
 Meprobamate (2-methyl-2-propyl-1,3-propanediol dicarbamate)
 Methyprylon (3,3-diethyl-5-methyl-2,4-piperidinedione)
 Benzodiazepines, their salts and derivatives, including:
 Alprazolam (8-chloro-1-methyl-6-phenyl-4H-s-triazolo[4,3-a][1,4] benzodiazepine)
 Bromazepam (7-bromo-1,3-dihydro-5-(2-pyridyl)-2H-1, 4-benzodiazepin-2-one)
 Brotizolam (2-bromo-4-(o-chlorophenyl)-9-methyl-6H-thieno[3,2-f]-s-triazolo[4,3-a][1,4]diazepine)
 Camazepam (7-chloro-1,3-dihydro-3-(N,N- dimethylcarbamoyl)-1-methyl-5-phenyl-2H-1, 4-benzodiazepin-2-one)
 Chlordiazepoxide (7-chloro-2-(methylamino)-5-phenyl-3H-1,4-benzodiazepine-4-oxide)
 Clobazam (7-chloro-1-methyl-5-phenyl-1H-1,5-benzodiazepine-2,4(3H,5H)-dione)
 Clonazepam (5-(o-chlorophenyl)-1,3-dihydro-7-nitro-2H-1,4-benzodiazepin-2-one)
 Clorazepate (7-chloro-2,3-dihydro-2,2-dihydroxy-5-phenyl-1H-1,4-benzodiazepine-3-carboxylic acid)
 Cloxazolam (10-chloro-11b-(o-chlorophenyl)-2,3, 7,11b-tetrahydrooxazolo[3,2-d][1,4]benzodiazepin 6-(5H)-one)
 Delorazepam (7-chloro-5-(o-chlorophenyl)-1,3-dihydro-2H-1,4-benzodiazepin-2-one)
 Diazepam (7-chloro-1,3-dihydro-1-methyl-5-phenyl-2H-1,4-benzodiazepin-2-one)
 Estazolam (8-chloro-6-phenyl-4H-s-triazolo [4,3-a][1,4]benzodiazepine)
 Ethyl Loflazepate (ethyl 7-chloro-5-(o-fluorophenyl)-2,3-dihydro-2-oxo-1H-1,4-benzodiazepine-3-carboxylate)
 Fludiazepam (7-chloro-5-(o-fluorophenyl)-1,3-dihydro-1-methyl-2H-1,4-benzodiazepin-2-one)
 [Repealed, SOR/98-173, s. 2]
 Flurazepam (7-chloro-1-[2-(diethylamino) ethyl]-5-(o-fluorophenyl)-1,3-dihydro-2H-1,4-benzodiazepin-2-one)
 Halazepam (7-chloro-1,3-dihydro-5-phenyl-1-(2,2,2-trifluoroethyl)-2H-1,4-benzodiazepin-2-one)
 Haloxazolam (10-bromo-11b-(o-fluorophenyl)-2,3,7,11b-tetrahydrooxazolo[3,2-d][1,4]benzodiazepin-6(5H)-one)
 Ketazolam (11-chloro-8,12b-dihydro-2,8-dimethyl-12b-phenyl-4H-[1,3]-oxazino-[3,2-d][1,4] benzodiazepine-4,7(6H)-dione)
 Loprazolam (6-(o-chlorophenyl)-2,4-dihydro-2-[(4-methyl-1-piperazinyl)methylene]-8-nitro-1H-imidazo[1,2-a][1,4]benzodiazepin-1-one)
 Lorazepam (7-chloro-5-(o-chlorophenyl)-1,3-dihydro-3-hydroxy-2H-1,4-benzodiazepin-2-one)
 Lormetazepam (7-chloro-5-(o-chlorophenyl)-1,3-dihydro-3-hydroxy-1-methyl-2H-1,4-benzodiazepin-2-one)
 Medazepam (7-chloro-2,3-dihydro-1-methyl-5-phenyl-1H-1,4-benzodiazepine)
 Midazolam (8-chloro-6-(o-fluorophenyl)-1-methyl-4H-imidazo[1,5-a][1,4]benzodiazepine)
 Nimetazepam (1,3-dihydro-1-methyl-7-nitro-5-phenyl-2H-1,4-benzodiazepin-2-one)
 Nitrazepam (1,3-dihydro-7-nitro-5-phenyl-2H-1,4-benzodiazepin-2-one)
 Nordazepam (7-chloro-1,3-dihydro-5-phenyl-2H-1,4-benzodiazepin-2-one)
 Oxazepam (7-chloro-1,3-dihydro-3-hydroxy-5-phenyl-2H-1,4-benzodiazepin-2-one)
 Oxazolam (10-chloro-2,3,7,11b-tetrahydro-2-methyl-11b-phenyloxazolo[3,2-d] [1,4]benzodiazepin-6(5H)-one)
 Pinazepam (7-chloro-1,3-dihydro-5-phenyl-1-(2-propynyl)-2H-1,4-benzodiazepin-2-one)
 Prazepam (7-chloro-1-(cyclopropylmethyl)-1, 3-dihydro-5-phenyl-2H-1,4-benzodiazepin-2-one)
 Quazepam (7-chloro-5-(o-fluorophenyl)-1,3-dihydro-1-(2,2,2-trifluoroethyl)-2H-1,4-benzodiazepine-2-thione)
 Temazepam (7-chloro-1,3-dihydro-3-hydroxy-1-methyl-5-phenyl-2H-1,4-benzodiazepin-2-one)
 Tetrazepam (7-chloro-5-(cyclohexen-1-yl)-1,3-dihydro-1-methyl-2H-1,4-benzodiazepin-2-one)
 Triazolam (8-chloro-6-(o-chlorophenyl)-1-methyl-4H-s-triazolo[4,3-a][1,4]benzodiazepine)but not including:
 Clozapine (8-chloro-11-(4-methyl-1-piperazinyl)-5H-dibenzo[b,e][1,4]diazepine) and any salt thereof
 Flunitrazepam (5-(o-fluorophenyl)-1,3-dihydro-1-methyl-7-nitro-2H-1,4-benzodiazepin-2-one) and any salts or derivatives thereof
 Olanzapine (2-methyl-4-(4-methyl-1-piperazinyl)-10H-thieno[2,3-b][1,5]benzodiazepine) and its salts
 Clozapine N-oxide (8-chloro-11-(4-methyl-4-oxido-1-piperazinyl)-5H-dibenzo[b,e][1,4]diazepine) and its salts
 Catha edulis Forsk., its preparations, derivatives, alkaloids and salts, including:
 Cathine (d-threo-2-amino-1-hydroxy-1-phenylpropane)
 Fencamfamin (d,l-N-ethyl-3-phenylbicyclo[2,2,1] heptan-2-amine) and any salt thereof
 Fenproporex (d,l-3-[(α-methylphenethyl)amino]propionitrile) and any salt thereof
 Mefenorex (d,l-N-(3-chloropropyl)-α-methylbenzeneethanamine) and any salt thereof
 Anabolic steroids and their derivatives including:
 Androisoxazole (17ß-hydroxy-17α-methylandrostano [3,2-c]isoxazole)
 Androstanolone (17ß-hydroxy-5α-androstan-3-one)
 Androstenediol (androst-5-ene-3ß,17ß-diol)
 Bolandiol (estr-4-ene-3ß,17ß-diol)
 Bolasterone (17ß-hydroxy-7α,17-dimethylandrost-4-en-3-one)
 Bolazine (17ß-hydroxy-2α-methyl-5α-androstan-3-one azine)
 Boldenone (17ß-hydroxyandrosta-1,4-dien-3-one)
 Bolenol (19-nor-17α-pregn-5-en-17-ol)
 Calusterone (17ß-hydroxy-7ß,17-dimethylandrost-4-en-3-one)
 Clostebol (4-chloro-17ß-hydroxyandrost-4-en-3-one)
 Drostanolone (17ß-hydroxy-2α-methyl-5α-androstan-3-one)
 Enestebol (4, 17ß-dihydroxy-17-methylandrosta-1,4-dien-3-one)
 Epitiostanol (2α, 3α-epithio-5α-androstan-17ß-ol)
 Ethylestrenol (19-nor-17α-pregn-4-en-17-ol)
 4-Hydroxy-19-nor testosterone (4-HO-Nandrolone)
 Fluoxymesterone (9-fluoro-11ß,17ß-dihydroxy-17-methylandrost-4-en-3-one)
 Formebolone (11α, 17ß-dihydroxy-17-methyl-3-oxoandrosta-1,4 di-en-2-carboxaldehyde)
 Furazabol (17-methyl-5α-androstano[2,3-c] furazan-17ß-ol)
 Mebolazine (17ß-hydroxy-2α,17-dimethyl-5α-androstan-3-one azine)
 Mesabolone (17ß-[(1-methoxycyclohexyl)oxy]-5α-androst-1-en-3-one)
 Mesterolone (17ß-hydroxy-1α-methyl-5α-androstan-3-one)
 Metandienone (17ß-hydroxy-17-methylandrosta-1,4-dien-3-one)
 Metenolone (17ß-hydroxy-1-methyl-5α-androst-1-en-3-one)
 Methandriol (17α-methylandrost-5-ene-3ß,17ß-diol)
 Methyltestosterone (17ß-hydroxy-17-methylandrost-4-en-3-one)
 Metribolone (17ß-hydroxy-17-methylestra-4, 9,11-trien-3-one)
 Mibolerone (17ß-hydroxy-7α,17-dimethylestr-4-en-3-one)
 Nandrolone (17ß-hydroxyestr-4-en-3-one)
 Norboletone (13-ethyl-17ß-hydroxy-18, 19-dinorpregn-4-en-3-one)
 Norclostebol (4-chloro-17ß-hydroxyestr-4-en-3-one)
 Norethandrolone (17α-ethyl-17ß-hydroxyestr-4-en-3-one)
 Oxabolone (4,17ß-dihydroxyestr-4-en-3-one)
 Oxandrolone (17ß-hydroxy-17-methyl-2-oxa-5α-androstan-3-one)
 Oxymesterone (4,17ß-dihydroxy-17-methylandrost-4-en-3-one)
 Oxymetholone (17ß-hydroxy-2-(hydroxymethylene)-17-methyl-5α-androstan-3-one)
 Prasterone (3ß-hydroxyandrost-5-en-17-one)
 Quinbolone (17ß-(1-cyclopenten-1-yloxy) androsta-1,4-dien-3-one)
 Stanozolol (17ß-hydroxy-17-methyl-5α-androstano [3,2-c]pyrazole)
 Stenbolone (17ß-hydroxy-2-methyl-5α-androst-1-en-3-one)
 Testosterone (17ß-hydroxyandrost-4-en-3-one)
 Tibolone ((7α,17α)-17-hydroxy-7-methyl-19-norpregn-5(10) en-20-yn-3-one)
 Tiomesterone (1α,7α-bis(acetylthio)-17ß -hydroxy-17-methylandrost-4-en-3-one)
 Trenbolone (17ß-hydroxyestra-4,9,11-trien-3-one)
 Zeranol (3,4,5,6,7,8,9,10,11,12-decahydro-7,14,16-trihydroxy-3-methyl-1H-2-benzoxacyclotetradecin-1-one)
 Zolpidem (N,N,6-trimethyl-2-(4-methylphenyl)imidazo[1,2-a]pyridine-3-acetamide) and any salt thereof
 Pemoline (2-amino-5-phenyl-oxazolin-4-one) and any salt thereof
 Pyrovalerone (4′-methyl-2-(1-pyrrolidinyl)valerophenone) and any salt thereof
 Salvia divinorum (S. divinorum), its preparations and derivatives, including:
 Salvinorin A ((2S,4aR,6aR,7R,9S,10aS,10bR)-9-(acetyloxy)-2-(3-furanyl)dodecahydro-6a,10b-dimethyl-4,10-dioxo-2H-naphtho[2,1-c]pyran-7-carboxylic acid methyl ester)

Schedule V

(Sections 2, 5 to 7.1, 10, 55 and 60.1)

1996, c. 19, Sch. V; SOR/2002-361, s. 1; SOR/2003-32, s. 7; 2017, c. 7, s. 50.

Schedule VI (Precursors)

PART 1
Class A Precursors
 Acetic anhydride
 N-Acetylanthranilic acid (2-acetamidobenzoic acid) and its salts
 Anthranilic acid (2-aminobenzoic acid) and its salts
 Ephedrine (erythro-2-(methylamino)-1-phenylpropan-1-ol), its salts and any plant containing ephedrine or any of its salts
 Ergometrine (9,10-didehydro-N-(2-hydroxy-1-methylethyl)-6-methylergoline-8-carboxamide) and its salts
 Ergotamine (12′-hydroxy-2′-methyl-5′-(phenylmethyl)ergotaman-3′,6′,18-trione) and its salts
 Isosafrole (5-(1-propenyl)-1,3-benzodioxole)
 Lysergic acid (9,10-didehydro-6-methylergoline-8-carboxylic acid) and its salts
 3,4-Methylenedioxyphenyl-2-propanone (1-(1,3-benzodioxole)-2-propanone)
 Norephedrine (Phenylpropanolamine) and its salts
 1-Phenyl-2-propanone
 Phenylacetic acid and its salts
 Piperidine and its salts
 Piperonal (1,3-benzodioxole-5-carboxaldehyde)
 Potassium permanganate
 Propionyl Chloride
 Pseudoephedrine (threo-2-(methylamino)-1-phenylpropan-1-ol), its salts and any plant containing pseudoephedrine or any of its salts
 Safrole (5-(2-propenyl)-1,3-benzodioxole) and any essential oil containing more than 4% safrole
 Gamma-butyrolactone (dihydro-2(3H)-furanone)
 1,4-butanediol
 Red Phosphorus
White Phosphorus
 Hypophosphorous acid, its salts and derivatives
 Hydriodic acid
 Alpha-phenylacetoacetonitrile and its salts, isomers and salts of isomers

PART 2
Class B Precursors
 Acetone
 Diethyl ether
 Hydrochloric acid
 Methyl ethyl ketone
 Sulfuric acid
 Toluene

PART 3
Preparations and Mixtures
 Any preparation or mixture that contains a precursor set out in Part 1, except items 20 to 23 [Red Phosphorus; White Phosphorus; Hypophosphorous acid, its salts and derivatives; Hydriodic acid], or in Part 2.

Schedule VII
[Repealed, 2018, c. 16, s. 205]

Schedule VIII
[Repealed, 2018, c. 16, s. 205]

Laws – Penalties

Possession
If tried as an indictable offence, the defendant is liable to:

Schedule I: Maximum 7 years' imprisonment
Schedule II: Maximum 5 years' imprisonment
Schedule III: Maximum 3 years' imprisonment
Schedule IV: It is not an indictable offence to possess a Schedule IV substance for personal use.

If tried as a summary conviction offence, the defendant is liable to:

Schedule I, II, or III: Maximum $1000 fine for the first offence and/or a maximum 6-month term of imprisonment, increasing to a maximum fine of $2000 for each subsequent offense and/or a maximum of 1 year in prison.
Schedule IV: It is not a summary offence to possess a Schedule IV substance for personal use.

Section (4), Subsection (2) of the CDSA reads that any person who obtains or who makes any attempt to obtain a Schedule I through IV substance from a physician without fully disclosing the details of any previous instances of obtaining a Schedule I through IV substance in the preceding thirty (30) days, a practice often referred to as "doctor shopping", is guilty of a summary or indictable offense, as per Section (4), Subsection (7)(a) and (b). 

These drugs are considered lawful (and thus without penalty) if the person from whom the substance, precursor or property was seized came into possession of it lawfully and continued to deal with it lawfully, such as through a prescription by a prescribing practitioner.

Trafficking/Possession for the Purpose of
If tried as an indictable offence, the defendant is liable to:

Schedule I or Schedule II: Maximum life imprisonment
Schedule III: Maximum 10 years' imprisonment
Schedule IV: Maximum 3 years' imprisonment

Or, if tried as a summary conviction, the defendant is liable to:

Schedule III: Maximum 18 months' imprisonment
Schedule IV: Maximum 1 year's imprisonment

Smuggling/Possession for the Purpose of Distribution
If tried as an indictable offence, the defendant is liable to:

Schedule I or Schedule II: Maximum life imprisonment
 Mandatory minimum 1 year's imprisonment for exporting a Schedule I drug under 1 kg, 2 years if amount exceeds 1 kg
Schedule III or Schedule IV: Maximum 10 years' imprisonment
Schedule V or Schedule VI: Maximum 3 years' imprisonment

Or, if tried as a summary conviction, the defendant is liable to:

Schedule III or Schedule IV: Maximum 18 months' imprisonment
Schedule V or Schedule VI: Maximum 1 year's imprisonment

Production
If tried as an indictable offence, the defendant is liable to:

Schedule I or Schedule II: Maximum life imprisonment
 Mandatory minimum 2 years' imprisonment
Schedule III: Maximum 10 years' imprisonment
Schedule IV: Maximum 3 years' imprisonment

Or, if tried as a summary conviction, the defendant is liable to:

Schedule III: Maximum 18 months' imprisonment
Schedule IV: Maximum 1 year's imprisonment

See also
 Controlled Substances Act (US)
 Misuse of Drugs Act 1971 (UK)

Notes

References

External links
 Controlled Drugs and Substances Act.
 Amendments to the Controlled Drugs and Substances Act [Bill C-10, Part 2, Clauses 32-33, 39-48 and 50-51 (Former Bill S-10)]

Drug control law in Canada
Canadian federal legislation
1996 in Canadian law
1996 in cannabis
Canadian criminal law
Health Canada